Rumney Marsh Reservation is a Massachusetts state park occupying over  in the town of Saugus and city of Revere. The salt marsh is located within the Saugus and Pines River estuary and provides habitat for many different migratory birds and marine life. The park is managed by the Massachusetts Department of Conservation and Recreation.

Activities and amenities
Visitors can partake in birdwatching, non-motorized boating, fishing, walking, and hiking.

References

External links
Rumney Marsh Reservation Department of Conservation and Recreation

State parks of Massachusetts
Massachusetts natural resources
Saugus, Massachusetts
Parks in Essex County, Massachusetts
Parks in Suffolk County, Massachusetts
Revere, Massachusetts